Douglas County High School may refer to:

Douglas County High School (Colorado)
Douglas County High School (Douglasville, Georgia)
Douglas County High School (Nevada)